The Denver Broncos are an American football franchise based in Denver, Colorado. Founded by Bob Howsam on August 14, 1959, the team was one of the founder members of the American Football League (AFL), which began in 1960, before merging with the National Football League (NFL) ahead of the 1970 season, when the Broncos became part of the American Football Conference (AFC) West division; they have been in the same division ever since. As of the end of the 2020 season, Denver has completed 61 seasons (playing in over 970 combined regular season and playoff games), and has appeared in eight Super Bowls; although they lost in each of their first four Super Bowl appearances, they have since won three of them, most recently Super Bowl 50.

The franchise has experienced three major periods of success. During this period, the Broncos had just two losing seasons, were AFC champions five times and were Super Bowl champions for two consecutive years. This second period of success is best remembered for John Elway being the team's quarterback. The most recent run of success began in 2011, lasting until their victory in Super Bowl 50 at the end of the 2015 season. The five-year stretch was primarily spearheaded by the 2012 free agent acquisition of the then four-time League MVP former Indianapolis Colts quarterback Peyton Manning, and included five AFC West titles, two AFC championships, as well as the Super Bowl. From their inaugural season in 1960 until , they did not make either the AFL playoffs or NFL playoffs and had just two winning seasons. The Broncos were the only charter AFL franchise to never have a winning season during the AFL's 10 years of existence (although the team finished at 7–7 in 1962), with their first winning season not occurring until 1973, their fourth year as a member of the NFL's AFC.

The Broncos have been AFC West champions 15 times, winning the division for five consecutive seasons from 2011 to 2015, and have also earned wild card berths into the playoffs seven times, for a total of 22 playoff appearances. They have been conference champions eight times (tied with the Pittsburgh Steelers, and two behind the New England Patriots who have the most AFC championships) and Super Bowl champions thrice.

Seasons

Footnotes

References
General

 
 
 
 

Specific

 
Denver Broncos
seasons